Graham David Phillips (born April 14, 1993) is an American actor, filmmaker and singer. Beginning his acting career at the age of nine, Phillips is known for a variety of television, film, and stage roles; as Zach Florrick on the CBS series The Good Wife, Ben Tennyson in the film Ben 10: Race Against Time, and Evan Goldman in the Broadway musical 13, as well as a leading role in the independent film Staten Island Summer. He has also appeared in films such as Blockers and XOXO and in the recurring television roles of Nick St. Clair in Riverdale and Nate in Atypical. He made his feature film directorial debut in 2019 with The Bygone.

Personal life
Phillips was born on April 14, 1993, in Orange County, California. His father is Layn R. Phillips, an attorney and former U.S. district court judge. He was raised Episcopalian, and during his K-12 school years, attended St. Margaret's Episcopal School in San Juan Capistrano, California. He dated singer Ariana Grande from 2008 to 2011.

Phillips entered Princeton University in the fall of 2012, majoring in history while maintaining his acting career. His undergraduate thesis was on indigenous marginalization and resistance in the U.S. He graduated in 2017.

Career

Stage and music
Phillips starred as Evan Goldman in the musical comedy 13 on Broadway at the Bernard B. Jacobs Theatre which opened October 5, 2008 and closed January 4, 2009. It was directed by Jeremy Sams, choreographed by Christopher Gattelli, and its music and lyrics were by Jason Robert Brown and book by Dan Elish and Robert Horn.

Prior to his role in 13, Phillips played the title role in The Little Prince with the New York City Opera at Lincoln Center. The New York Times critic called Phillips' performance in the title role "smashing." From there Phillips went directly into the world premiere of An American Tragedy at the Metropolitan Opera where he played the part of Young Clyde, both opening and closing the opera with a solo.

Phillips' other professional stage credits include A Christmas Carol: The Musical on Broadway performed at Madison Square Garden where he sang the role of Tiny Tim to Jim Dale's Scrooge; The Ten Commandments: The Musical with Val Kilmer at the Kodak Theatre in Los Angeles. 

Phillips, at ten years old, was the second youngest person to sing the National Anthem to open a Los Angeles Dodgers baseball game (behind 9-year-old Jessica Tivens in 1990). He has also debuted original songs composed by Martin Charnin and John Kander in New York. He appeared twice on The Today Show as a soloist. Phillips recorded a solo composed by Alan Menken and Stephen Schwartz for the film Noel starring Robin Williams and Susan Sarandon. He also was a soloist on Meat Loaf's 2006 album Bat Out of Hell III: The Monster Is Loose.

Screen acting
Phillips had a co-starring role as Jordan Baxter, the middle son, in the feature film Evan Almighty, starring Steve Carell, Morgan Freeman and Lauren Graham, which premiered June 22, 2007. In the fall of 2007 he completed working on the feature film Stolen Lives starring Josh Lucas. Phillips also played the lead role in Ben 10: Race Against Time. His television credits include The Good Wife, Crossing Jordan, Judging Amy, The King of Queens, White Collar, and the Hallmark film Love's Long Journey.

Phillips, along with the rest of the cast of The Good Wife, has received three Screen Actors Guild Award nominations for Outstanding Performance by an Ensemble in a Drama Series. He has also received three Young Artist Award nominations; Best Performance By a Leading Young Actor in a TV Movie, Miniseries or Special for his role in Ben 10: Race Against Time, Best Performance by a Supporting Young Actor in a Feature Film for his role in Evan Almighty, and Best Supporting Young Actor in a TV Series for his role in The Good Wife. He also plays Roger in the go90.com series Guidance.

Phillips played Austin in the 2018 film "Blockers." He started alongside Kathryn Newton.

Phillips played Nick St. Clair in the second season of the teen drama television series Riverdale. In 2019, Phillips played Prince Eric in ABC's The Little Mermaid Live!

Directing and production 
In 2014, Phillips co-founded a small production company Grind Arts Co. with choreographer-actor Eamon Foley. Foley, who co-starred with Phillips in 13, also was attending Princeton. With Grind, Phillips produced and acted in experimental adaptions of Sweeney Todd and The Last Five Years, and directed a short film titled Color + Light. Phillips also directed a Princeton production of the musical Once in 2016.

Since 2014, Phillips has run the independent film production studio Phillips Pictures with his brother Parker Phillips. As a writer-director team – billed as Graham & Parker Phillips – they have worked on a number of projects together. They released the original short film The Mediator in 2014. In 2019, the Phillips brothers made their feature filmmaking debut with The Bygone. The film was distributed by Netflix. The brothers are currently signed to direct Rumble Through The Dark, a film based on The Fighter by Michael Farris Smith.

Filmography

Film

Television

Theater

Discography

References

External links
 

1993 births
21st-century American male actors
American male child actors
American male film actors
Place of birth missing (living people)
American male musical theatre actors
American male television actors
Living people
Male actors from California
People from Laguna Beach, California
Princeton University alumni